The West Indies women's cricket team toured Sri Lanka from 13 to 26 May 2015. The tour included four One Day Internationals (ODI) and three Twenty20 Internationals (T20I). The later three matches of the ODI series were part of the ICC Women's Championship. The West Indies won both series, the ODI by 3–1 and the T20I by 2–1.

Squads

ODI series

1st ODI

2nd ODI

3rd ODI

4th ODI

T20I series

1st T20I

2nd T20I

3rd T20I

References

External links 

Women's international cricket tours of Sri Lanka
2014–16 ICC Women's Championship
2015 in women's cricket
2015 in West Indian cricket
2015 in Sri Lankan cricket
Sri Lanka 2015